This list is of that portion of the National Register of Historic Places (NRHP) designated in Essex County, Massachusetts. The locations of these properties and districts for which the latitude and longitude coordinates are included below, may be seen in a map.

There are more than 450 designated properties in the county, including 26 that are further designated as National Historic Landmarks. The municipalities of Andover, Gloucester, Ipswich, Lawrence, Lynn, Methuen, and Salem are to be found on a separate list(s) of the more than 200 identified here, except two properties are split between Methuen and Lawrence, and one between Lynn and Nahant; these entries appear on more than one list.



Cities and towns listed separately
Due to the number of listings in the county, some cities and towns have their sites listed separately.

Current listings in other cities and towns

|}

See also

List of National Historic Landmarks in Massachusetts
National Register of Historic Places listings in Massachusetts

References

Essex County, Massachusetts
Essex